The Hollywood Music in Media Award for Best Music Supervision – Television is one of the awards given annually to people working in the television industry by the Hollywood Music in Media Awards (HMMA). It is presented to the music supervisors who have overseen music for a production. The award was first given in 2014, during the fifth annual awards.

Winners and nominees

2010s

2020s

References

Best Music Supervision - Television
American television awards